Zhao Yuan is a noted Chinese painter in late Yuan and early Ming Dynasty. His birth and death years are unknown. His courtesy name was Shanzhang (善长), and sobriquet Danlin （丹林）. He was born in Ying Cheng (营城) (present day Yingxian (营县) of Shandong Province). He resided in Suzhou. His painting style most closely resembled that of Wang Meng. Existing works include 晴川送别 (Farewell on the Clear River) and 合溪草堂.

References

External links
Sung and Yuan paintings, an exhibition catalog from The Metropolitan Museum of Art Libraries (fully available online as PDF), which contains material on Zhao Yuan (see list of paintings)

Year of birth missing
Year of death missing
Yuan dynasty painters
Ming dynasty painters
Painters from Shandong